Liga Mayor de Honduras (Honduran Major League) is the third division of football in Honduras. It is composed of separate departmental leagues. The league is divided into two regions, North and South. Both regions are further divided into two groups (four total). Promotion to Liga de Ascenso de Honduras is decided by a promotion final in each region (one in the North and one in the South). The finalist of said promotion final, are winners of each of their respective group. The groups are composed of departmental champions. One team from each region is promoted to Liga de Ascenso de Honduras, two in total.

Teams
The league is divided into four regional groups.

Occidental (West)

Santa Barbara
Real Honduras (San Luis)

Atlantico (Atlantic)
Departamental representatives for 2012-13
Boca Junior  (Tocoa, Colón)
Atlético Limeño (La Lima, Cortés)
Atlético Bahia (Roatán, Islas de la Bahia)
San Juan (San Juan Pueblo, Atlántida)
Lenca (El Progreso, Yoro)

Tela
Liga Mayor José Trinidad Cabañas
 Cerro Porteño 
 Tela Deportivo
 Los Pumas 
 Academia Deportiva Mingo Ramos (ADMIRA)
 San Alejo Fútbol Club
 San Jose Fútbol Club

Colón
Liga Mayor Gilberto Medina de Sabá (2007/08)
 Agua Caliente
 Aguan Valle
 Aguila
 Atletico Juvenil
 Atletico Valle
 Elixir
 Inter
 Saba Deportivo
 Universidad Catolica

Cortés
Winners from each group and best loser play a quadrangular. The winner from this quadrangular plays against winners from other quadrangulars in Zona Noroccidental

Group A
 Atlético Infop (Choloma)
 Atlético Limeño (La Lima)
 Brasilia
 Esfuerzo Pirata
 Honduritas
 Productores Asociados
 San Manuel Junior
 Sicilia

Group B
 Atlético Potrerillos (Potrerillos)
 Fuerza Aérea (San Pedro Sula)
 Juventus
 Municipal Calán
 Nacional
 Real Cofradía (Cofradia)
 Real Yojoa
 Río Lindo

Group C
 AquaFinca
 Fuerzas Básicas (Puerto Cortes)
 Platense Jr. (San Pedro Sula)
 PSA
 Pumas
 San Ramón (Puerto Cortes)

Liga Mayor Carlos A. Turnbull de La Lima (2007/08)
 Atletico Limenos
 Barcelona
 Campos Dos
 Cordova
 Juventud Olimpica
 Producciones Associados
 S.D. Aguilas
 Union Chotepeña

Islas de la Bahia
 Home Boy (Roatan)
 Regional (Guanaja)
 Dortmund FC

Yoro
 Aguila (El Negrito)
 C.D. Atlético Junior (El Negrito)
 Dole

Sur-Centro (South-Central)

Choluteca
 Águila (San Marcos de Colon)
 Argentina Junior (Marcovia)
 Atlético Pumas (El Triunfo)
 Atlético Valle (Choluteca)
 Boca Junior (Marcovia)
 Danubio (Morolica)
 Fas (El Triunfo)
 Independiente (Monjaras)
 Inst. Mateo Molina (Pespire)
 León Libertador (Choluteca)
 Mar Azul (Monjaras)
 Pinares (San Marcos de Colon)
 Real Pespirense (Pespire)
 Juventus(san Jeronimo)
 Real San jeronimo tecnico: (Daniel Cruz)(San Jeronimo)

Other Teams - Unknown
 Atletico Alamesa
 Canada Estrellita
 Deportes Concepcion
 Halcones
 Juventud Estudiantil
 Luisiana F.C.
 Real Junior

Playoffs
Ida 
Que-Finals 
Atlético Limeno 1 3
Juventus        1 2
Platane         1 0
Real Junior     0 1
Fas             0 2
Dole            0 2
Pumas           2 2(4)
Luisiana        2 2(5)
Semifinales 
Juventus       1 2
Real Junior    1 0
Fas            0 3
Luisiana       1 2
Final  
Juventus           0 3 5
Fas  El  Triunfo   0 2 4

Promotion Playoffs

Zona Norte
Zona Norte'''s (North zone) promotion is contested between Grupo Occidental (Western Group) champions and Grupo Atlantico (Atlantic Group) champions. Incomplete list.

Zona SurZona Sur's (South zone) promotion is contested between Grupo Oriental (Eastern Group) champions and Grupo Centro-Sur'' (South-Central Group) champions. Incomplete list.

References

 
Mayor
Honnduras